Altos Labs, Inc. is an American biotechnology research company. Altos Labs' goal is to develop life extension therapies that can halt or reverse the human aging process. Specialized cell therapies based on induced pluripotent stem cells are to be developed for this purpose. The company was started in 2022.

History 
Altos Labs was formally started on 19 January 2022. The name Altos Labs is based on the city of Los Altos in California. The idea for Altos Labs originated with cell biologist and entrepreneur Richard D. Klausner, who co-founded the company with Hans Bishop.

In 2021, Altos Labs was registered in the United States and the United Kingdom. It will operate out of California (U.S.) and Cambridge (U.K.), with some work performed in Japan.

Investments 
One of the early investors of Altos Labs is an investment vehicle held for the benefit of the Breakthrough Foundation, founded by Russian-Israeli science and technology investor and philanthropist Yuri Milner and his wife Julia. The foundation supports existing and future philanthropic projects in fundamental sciences. Milner had previously shown interest in anti-aging technologies, in October 2020, he co-hosted a meeting where experts presented their research, reported on animal testing, and the concept for Altos Labs was developed.

Altos Labs raised $3 billion in a funding round from investors in January 2022. It is said to be the best funded biotech start-up to date. Investors reportedly included Amazon founder Jeff Bezos.

Notable scientists and recruitment 
The company has been able to recruit prominent scientists such as:
 Juan Carlos Izpisúa Belmonte (known for his work on rejuvenation through cell reprogramming)
 Steve Horvath (known for his work on the epigenetic aging clock)
 Shinya Yamanaka (the Nobel Prize-winning inventor of cellular reprogramming in mammalian cells).

The board of directors also includes well-known scientists such as Jennifer A. Doudna, David Baltimore, and Frances Arnold.

Salaries for principal investigators at Altos Labs may be ten times higher than at comparable research institutions.

Facilities 
Altos Labs plans to establish research facilities in Cambridge, the San Francisco Bay Area, and in San Diego as a first step.

Mission 
Atypical of a private company, the initial focus will be on basic research without immediate prospects of a commercially viable product.

In January 2022 the company's president, Hans Bishop, argued, that Altos Labs was working on increasing the "healthspan" of humans and that longevity extension would only be "an accidental consequence".

External links

See also 
 Verily
 Calico
 SENS Research Foundation
 Human Longevity
 Life extension

References 

Biotechnology companies of the United States